Donald Leslie Brothers (November 8, 1923 – February 9, 2017) was a lawyer and political figure in British Columbia. He represented Rossland-Trail in the Legislative Assembly of British Columbia from 1958 to 1972 as a Social Credit member.

He was born in Grand Forks, British Columbia, the son of Montezuma Leslie Brothers and Lorna May Cumming, and was educated at the University of British Columbia. Brothers served as a pilot in the Royal Canadian Air Force during World War II. In 1947, he married Dorothy Marie Crowe. Brothers ran unsuccessfully in the federal riding of Kootenay West as a Social Credit candidate in 1957. He was first elected to the provincial assembly in a 1958 by-election held after Robert Sommers was convicted of bribery and conspiracy. Brothers served in the provincial cabinet as Minister of Mines and Petroleum Resources and as Minister of Education. He was defeated by Christopher D'Arcy when he ran for reelection in 1972. He died at the age of 93 in 2017.

References 

1923 births
2017 deaths
British Columbia candidates for Member of Parliament
British Columbia Social Credit Party MLAs
Canadian World War II pilots
Education ministers of British Columbia
Lawyers in British Columbia
Members of the Executive Council of British Columbia
Royal Canadian Air Force officers
Royal Canadian Air Force personnel of World War II
Social Credit Party of Canada candidates for the Canadian House of Commons
University of British Columbia alumni
20th-century Canadian legislators